Wolaniny  is a village in the administrative district of Gmina Biłgoraj, within Biłgoraj County, Lublin Voivodeship, in eastern Poland.

The village has a population of 11.

References

Villages in Biłgoraj County